De Profundis is a role-playing game by Polish designer . Players create the game's narrative by writing each other letters in the style of horror author H. P. Lovecraft. The game has practically no game mechanics. Rather, it emphasizes character and atmosphere, and attempts to blur the line between play and real life. There is also an option for solo play.

History
De Profundis (2001), designed by Michael Oracz, was the final New Style role-playing game published by Hogshead Publishing. According to Shannon Appelcline, "It was a Lovecraftian-styled game but about as far from Call of Cthulhu as you can get. It is best remembered for its correspondence rules, which allowed players to rather uniquely play the game through the exchange of in-character letters. Like most of the other New Style games, it did not include a Games Master and was oriented toward telling stories." De Profundis was reprinted by Cubicle 7 in 2010.

Game system 

The game has almost no game mechanics. There is no wargame apparatus, no die rolls, no statistics, no gamemaster. The game is like freeform role-playing games in that its rules are minimal, but differs from them in that players provide their own character details, there are no referees, and players interact via mail rather than face-to-face. If freeform RPGs are like improvisational theatre, De Profundis is like an improvisational epistolary novel.

The sourcebook recommends that players communicate through physical correspondence in order to capture the mood of Lovecraft's stories, to encourage the players to take ample time in crafting each response, and to allow for the exchange of props or strange artifacts between players. However, nothing in the rules precludes playing through other mediums, and games have been adapted for play by email, blog posts, or any combination of methods. The blog De Profundis (Che 2002) is an instance of solo play-by-post gaming via a blog.

The use of correspondence does not necessarily mean the game is play by mail. The Diana Jones Award committee has said the game instead reinvents the roleplaying form.

Designer Michal Oracz wrote the sourcebook as a series of letters in Lovecraftian style.

Hogshead marketed De Profundis: Letters From The Abyss with the tagline, "This game is intended for mentally stable adults".

Publication history and awards 

Polish game company Portal published De Profundis in 2001. British game company Hogshead Publishing translated the game into English and published it as De Profundis: Letters From The Abyss as part of their New Style imprint in 2002. The game was shortlisted for the 2001 Diana Jones Award for Excellence in Gaming.

In November 2002, James Wallis, Director of Hogshead Publishing, announced that Hogshead was leaving the adventure gaming industry due to boredom, creative frustration, and increasing despondence about the future of the specialist gaming industry. Hogshead returned the rights of the New Style games to their creators.

As of 2006, De Profundis: Letters From The Abyss is out of print, although Portal is still offering the Polish De Profundis on its website.

As of 2009, De Profundis second edition is being published in English by Cubicle 7, as both book and PDF, although as of October 2014 the book is marked as "Temporarily OUT OF PRINT", but the PDF is still available.

Reviews
Pyramid

References

Sources

British role-playing games
Hogshead Publishing games
Polish role-playing games
Role-playing games introduced in 2001